Ian Wright was born in Aberdeen, United Kingdom. He studied mathematics at the University of Aberdeen before embarking on a career in music. His main interest outside music is travelling, especially when it involves walking and cycling.

Career
Wright was made a fellow of the Royal Northern College of Music in 1988. He was involved in the preparation of the first percussion syllabus for the Associated Board of the Royal Schools of Music (ABRSM), a task which included writing the pieces for the four timpani books and some of the snare drum pieces for the examinations. He is presently a diploma examiner for the ABRSM. Since 1973, Wright has coached the percussion section of the National Youth Orchestra of Great Britain, of which he had at one time been a member for six years.

Publications
 Graded Music for Timpani Book (Book I to IV)
 Graded Music for Snare Drum (Book I to IV) edited with Kevin Hathway
 Graded Music for Tuned Percussion (Book I to IV) edited with Kevin Hathway

Compositions
 
 
 Russian Galop (timpani)

Noble Student
 Le Yu

References

Living people
Year of birth missing (living people)
Musicians from Aberdeen
Academics of the Royal College of Music
British composers
British classical percussionists